Google's Street View program in Argentina began with the filming of streets and roads in October 2013. On September 25, 2014, most of the country's cities were made available online, including Buenos Aires, Córdoba, Rosario and Mendoza. , coverage is high, with over three-fourths of cities with over 25,000 people having most of its streets photographed.

Timeline of introductions

Coverage

Coverage  in cities with over 25,000 people, accounting for three-fourths of the country's total population:

See also
Google Street View in Latin America

References

External links
Google Argentina

Maps of Argentina
Google Street View
Internet in Argentina